Rouven Meschede (born 20 January 1991) is a German former professional footballer who played as a midfielder.

Career
Meschede made his professional debut for Rot Weiss Ahlen in the 3. Liga on 18 September 2010, coming on as a substitute in the 86th minute for Sebastian Ghasemi-Nobakht in the 3–0 home win against Carl Zeiss Jena.

References

External links
 
 
 Hammer SpVg statistics at Fussball.de

1991 births
Living people
Sportspeople from Hamm
Footballers from North Rhine-Westphalia
German footballers
Association football midfielders
Rot Weiss Ahlen players
Hammer SpVg players
3. Liga players
Regionalliga players